Dwarf coati can refer to several species:

 Cozumel Island coati (Nasua narica nelsoni) – from Cozumel Island, Mexico.
 Eastern mountain coati (Nasuella meridensis) – from the Andes in Venezuela.
 Western mountain coati (Nasuella olivacea) – from the Andes in Colombia and Ecuador.

Animal common name disambiguation pages
Procyonidae